The Inn of the Sixth Happiness is a 1958 20th Century Fox film based on the true story of Gladys Aylward, a tenacious British woman, who became a missionary in China during the Second Sino-Japanese War. Directed by Mark Robson, who received a nomination for the Academy Award for Best Director, the film stars Ingrid Bergman as Aylward and Curt Jürgens as her love interest, Captain Lin Nan, a Chinese Army officer with a Dutch father. Robert Donat, who played the mandarin of the town in which Aylward lived, died before the film was released. The musical score was composed and conducted by Malcolm Arnold. The cinematography was by Freddie Young.

The film was shot in Snowdonia, North Wales. Most of the children in the film were ethnic Chinese children from Liverpool, home to the oldest Chinese community in Europe.

Plot 
The story begins with Aylward (Ingrid Bergman) being rejected as a potential missionary to China because of her lack of education. Dr. Robinson (Moultrie Kelsall), the senior missionary, feels sorry for her and secures her a position in the home of Sir Francis Jamison (Ronald Squire), a veteran explorer with contacts in China. Over the next few months, Aylward saves her money to purchase a ticket on the Trans-Siberian Railway, choosing the more dangerous overland route to the East because it is less expensive. Sir Francis writes to his only surviving friend in China,  veteran missionary, Jeannie Lawson (Athene Seyler), who agrees to accept Gladys as a much-needed assistant at her mission in the remote county of Yangcheng. Lawson has set up an inn for muleteers, where the men can get clean food for their animals, communal beds without bugs, a good hot meal and Lawson's free stories (from the Bible). The film follows Aylward's acculturation, until tragedy strikes and Lawson dies when a balcony collapses. Captain Lin (Curt Jürgens), the commander of Yancheng's garrison, advises Aylward to go home and wishes her well as he leaves.

Aylward takes over running the inn, with the help of Yang (Peter Chong), the devoted cook, who tells the stories himself while teaching Aylward Chinese. The local Mandarin (Robert Donat) appoints Aylward as his Foot Inspector, charging her with enforcing the government's command that the ancient practice of foot binding be eradicated. She succeeds in this assignment, winning the esteem of the people and of the Mandarin as she travels regularly through the mountains, earning the nickname “She who loves” and becoming a Chinese citizen. When Lin, now a Colonel, returns to prepare the region for war with Japan, she has just stopped a prison riot. Lin goes with her on her rounds. Before he leaves, they confess their love.

In 1937, Japan invades China. An air raid shatters the city, killing Yang. The Mandarin evacuates the population to the countryside, and Li (Bert Kwouk), a former prisoner, comes to help Aylward with her five adopted children.

Later, Lin returns with the news that the war is going badly and the Mandarin must go to a safe haven. Lin wants her to go too, but she says “These are my people and I will live and die for them.” They kiss. At a last meeting with his council, the Mandarin announces that he is converting to Christianity to honour Aylward and the faith that underlies her work. He says farewell: They will not meet again.

In the now-virtually deserted city, Aylward has gathered 50 children at the Inn, struggling to find food, facing a bitter winter, and not knowing where to go. Another 50 children arrive from another mission with a letter from the missionary telling her that trucks will evacuate them to a new home in the interior, but they must get to the mission at Seeyan by November 12, in three weeks, or the trucks will leave without them. The trip should take a week by road, but Lin and his men intercept them and warn her that the Japanese control the road ahead. They must go over the mountains. She believes this is why God wanted her to come to China. Li gives her a map. Saying, “I know you'll come back if you can,” he puts a ring on her hand.

After a long, difficult journey, including a perilous river crossing, they all arrive safely (except for Li, who dies to save them from a Japanese patrol) on the day the trucks are to leave. The film culminates with the column of children, led by Aylward, marching through cheering crowds and up to the steps of the mission, singing the song "This Old Man”, which Aylward taught the children to warm themselves after the river crossing. Aylward is greeted by Dr. Robinson. She asks if he remembers her: “My  name used to be Gladys Aylward.” He nods gravely and replies, “Yes, I remember. Gladys Aylward, who wasn't qualified to come to China.”  He invites her to come to the children's village in the interior, but she declines: “I am going home,” she says, looking back toward the mountains.

Cast

 Ingrid Bergman as Gladys Aylward
 Curt Jürgens as Captain Lin Nan
 Robert Donat as the Mandarin of Yang Cheng
 Michael David as Hok-A
 Athene Seyler as Jeannie Lawson
 Ronald Squire as Sir Francis Jamison
 Moultrie Kelsall as Dr. Robinson
 Richard Wattis as Mr. Murfin
 Peter Chong as Yang
 Tsai Chin as Sui-Lan
 Edith Sharpe as Secretary at China Inland Mission 
 Joan Young as Sir Francis' cook 
 Lian-Shin Yang as Woman with Baby 
 Noel Hood as Miss Thompson (credited as Noël Hood)
 Burt Kwouk as Li 
 André Mikhelson as Russian Commissar (uncredited)
 Peter Foo as one of the children (uncredited)

Production

The film was shot in CinemaScope using the DeLuxe Color process.

For the production of The Inn of the Sixth Happiness, 20th Century Fox rented space at MGM British Studios Borehamwood, where the Chinese villages were built on the backlot, with location scenes filmed in Nantmor, near Beddgelert in North Wales.

A gold-painted statue of Buddha that was used on a set for the film is now located in the Italianate village of Portmeirion, North Wales. Sean Connery was considered for the role of Captain Lin. His screen test can be seen on the DVD.

Since the film's release, the filmmakers have been criticised for casting Ingrid Bergman, a tall woman with a Swedish accent, as Gladys Aylward, who was in fact short and had a cockney accent. Likewise, the two male leads, British actor Robert Donat and Austrian actor Curt Jurgens were not even Chinese (though Jurgens' character is said to be half-Dutch). Singer Bill Elliott sang the hit song "The Inn of the Sixth Happiness" with the Cyril Stapleton Orchestra.

Historical accuracy 

The film was based on the biography The Small Woman (1957) by Alan Burgess.

Gladys Aylward (1902-1970) was deeply upset by the inaccuracy of the film. Although she found herself a figure of international interest thanks to the popularity of the film and television and media interviews, Aylward was mortified by her depiction in the film and the many liberties it took. The tall, Swedish Ingrid Bergman was inconsistent with Aylward's small stature, dark hair and cockney accent. The struggles of Aylward and her family to effect her initial trip to China were skipped over in favour of the plot device of her employer "condescending to write to 'his old friend' Jeannie Lawson", and Aylward's dangerous, complicated travels across Russia and China were reduced to "a few rude soldiers", after which "Hollywood's train delivered her neatly to Tsientsin."

The names of many characters and places were changed, even when the names had significant meanings, such as those of Aylward's adopted children and of her inn, named for the Chinese belief that the number eight is auspicious: The Inn of the Eight Happinesses, (八福客栈 bāfú kèzhàn in Chinese). The name was based on the eight virtues: Love, Virtue, Gentleness, Tolerance, Loyalty, Truth, Beauty and Devotion. And in real life she was given the Chinese name 艾偉德 (Ài Wěi Dé – a Chinese approximation to 'Aylward' – meaning 'Virtuous One'), not the name used in the movie (兼愛 Jiān Ài relating to universal love as advocated by the ancient philosopher Mo Zi).

It is true that in 1938 she led almost 100 children 100 miles to safety from Japanese invaders. But real life was very different from the film. At the end of the journey, “the brown-eyed, modest missionary was virtually unconscious and delirious with typhus and fever.”

Captain Lin Nan was portrayed as half-European, a change which Aylward found insulting to his Chinese lineage. She also felt her reputation damaged by the Hollywood-embellished love scenes in the film; not only had she never kissed any man, but also the film's ending portrayed her character abandoning the orphans in order to join the captain elsewhere, even though in reality she worked with orphans for the rest of her life. In 1958, the year of the film's release, she founded a children's home in Taiwan, which she continued to run until her death in 1970. She continues to be regarded as a national hero.

Reception
The film was the second most popular film at the British box office in 1959 behind Carry on Nurse with a gross of $700,000.

The film is recognised by American Film Institute in these lists:
 2003: AFI's 100 Years...100 Heroes & Villains:
 Gladys Aylward – Nominated Hero
 2005: AFI's 100 Years of Film Scores – Nominated
 2006: AFI's 100 Years...100 Cheers – Nominated

References

External links 
 
 
 
 

1958 films
British drama films
20th Century Fox films
British films based on actual events
Films directed by Mark Robson
Films set in the 1930s
Films shot in Wales
Christian missions in China
Films set in Shanxi
Films based on British novels
Films scored by Malcolm Arnold
1950s Mandarin-language films
Second Sino-Japanese War films
Films shot at MGM-British Studios
American films based on actual events
American drama films
American multilingual films
British multilingual films
1950s English-language films
1950s Japanese-language films
1950s Russian-language films
1950s American films
1950s British films